The Bendix Trophy is a U.S. aeronautical racing trophy.  The transcontinental, point-to-point race, sponsored by industrialist Vincent Bendix founder of Bendix Corporation, began in 1931 as part of the National Air Races. Initial prize money for the winners was $15,000. The last Bendix Trophy Race was flown in 1962.

The trophy was brought back in 1998 by AlliedSignal, the then-owner of the Bendix brand name (which later merged with Honeywell), to "recognize contributions to aerospace safety by individuals or institutions through innovation in advanced safety equipment and equipment utilization."

The current awards of the Honeywell Bendix Trophy for Aviation Safety includes a scale reproduction of the original Bendix Trophy design and a citation.

The race
The purpose was to interest engineers in building faster, more reliable, and durable aircraft. Bendix competitors flew from Burbank, California, to Cleveland, Ohio, except for two years when the contest began in New York and ended in Los Angeles.

Famous competitors for the trophy included Jimmy Doolittle, who won the first race, and several women. Amelia Earhart was the first woman to enter the Bendix, taking fifth place in 1935. In 1936, Louise Thaden and her copilot Blanche Noyes won the race. Laura Ingalls finished second. In 1938, Jacqueline Cochran, arguably the greatest female aviator of all time, took home the trophy. Paul Mantz was the only pilot to ever win the Bendix three consecutive years, from 1946 through 1948.

The race was not run during World War II. Postwar winners were frequently military veterans from the United States Army Air Forces: the 1956 winner, Capt. Manuel Fernandez Jr., was the third-ranking Korean War USAF ace. By the 1960s, American interest in air racing declined. This was probably due to an increased focus on the space race during this time. Lt. Richard F. Gordon Jr., the winner in 1961, went on to become an astronaut with NASA.

Mister Mulligan
Mister Mulligan (Howard DGA-6), commissioned and flown by Ben Howard in the 1935 race, was the only airplane ever designed for the specific purpose of winning the Bendix Trophy. The plane was designed and developed by Ben Howard and Gordon Israel, who went on to become an engineer for the Grumman Aircraft Engineering Corporation. Mister Mulligan was designed to fly the entire length of the race nonstop and at high altitude. Neither had ever been done before. Howard and Israel, who co-piloted, won the trophy. Their victory changed how long-distance airplanes were designed.

The second-place plane in the 1935 race was actually a faster airplane but had to make refueling stops, which cost enough time to prevent Roscoe Turner from winning the race. The time difference was only 23.5 seconds between first and second place. Mister Mulligan achieved , compared to Roscoe Turner's .

Mister Mulligan not only won the Bendix Trophy but also the Thompson Trophy, when flown by Harold Neumann in 1935. Instead of a cross-country distance race, the Thompson was a closed-circuit race around pylons, a type of race for which it was not particularly well suited.

Winners

Honeywell Bendix trophy for Aviation Safety recipients

See also
 List of aviation awards

References
 "The Major Trophy Races of the Golden Age of Air Racing" by David H. Onkst, US Centennial of Flight Commission, retrieved January 6, 2006
 "The Bendix Trophy", Air Racing History, retrieved January 6, 2006
 "The Quest for Speed Bendix Air Races 1931 to 1949" From Air Trails, September 1950
 Artifacts – Bendix Trophy Smithsonian Institution Online Exhibit
 1954 USAF Serial Numbers entry number 2096
 Astronaut Bio: Richard F. Gordon Jr., (Captain, USN, Ret.)
 United States Air Force Aviation AeroWeb History
 Howard DGA-6 Mister Mulligan at the Arkansas Air Museum
 Service History of the Shooting Star
 Up From Kitty Hawk 1944-1953
 The National Air Races
 "Sport: Scoreboard, Sep. 14, 1953". Time magazine
 Seattle native Dick Gordon orbits the moon on November 18, 1969.
 Matthews, Birch J., Wet Wings & Drop Tanks: Recollections of American Transcontinental Air Racing 1928-1970. Atglen, Pennsylvania: Schiffer Publishing Company, 1993. .

External links

 The Honeywell Bendix Trophy for Aviation Safety at Flight Safety Foundation homepage
 Kenny's Long Shot about Kenny's 1954 Bendix Trophy run

Air races
Aviation awards
Awards established in 1931
Bendix Corporation